The 1990–91 Iowa Hawkeyes men's basketball team represented the University of Iowa as members of the Big Ten Conference. The team was led by fifth-year head coach Tom Davis and played their home games at Carver-Hawkeye Arena. They finished the season 21–11 overall and 9–9 in Big Ten play to finish tied for fifth place. The Hawkeyes received an at-large bid to the NCAA tournament as #7 seed in the Midwest Region. After defeating East Tennessee State 76-73 in the first round, the Hawkeyes lost to #2 seed, and eventual National Champion, Duke 85-70 in the Round of 32.

Roster

Schedule/results

|-
!colspan=8 style=| Non-conference regular season
|-

|-
!colspan=8 style=| Big Ten Regular Season
|-

|-
!colspan=8 style=| NCAA tournament

Rankings

References

Iowa Hawkeyes
Iowa
Iowa Hawkeyes men's basketball seasons
Hawk
Hawk